The 33rd Annual American Music Awards were held on November 22, 2005. They were hosted by Cedric the Entertainer. The awards recognized the most popular albums and artists from the year 2005.

Performances

Notes
  Broadcast live from the Delta Center, Salt Lake City.

Winners and nominees

References 

2005
2005 music awards